Bo Yang (1920–2008) is a Taiwanese writer.

Boyang is a town in Guangdong Province

Bo Yang or Boyang may also refer to:

 Jin Boyang (born 1997), a Chinese figure skater
 Wei Boyang, a noted Chinese author and Taoist alchemist of the Eastern Han Dynasty
 Boyang is also the courtesy name of the following persons:
 Laozi, a philosopher of ancient China
 Sun Ben, a military leader in the late Han Dynasty
 Zhao Xi (Han Dynasty), a politician of the early Eastern Han Dynasty

See also 
 Poyang (disambiguation), an alternate transliteration of Chinese name